The gold tetra (Hemigrammus rodwayi) is a species of small freshwater fish in the family Characidae native to lowland South America, where they are abundant in coastal floodplains. Their name comes from a powdery golden tint on their body that is thought to be caused by internal parasites. Gold tetras are peaceful, hardy, schooling community fish. Gold tetras have been successfully bred in captivity.

Although the patronym was not identified more than likely is in honor of James Rodway (1848-1926), a travel writer and naturalist, who participated in Carl Eigenmann’s collecting trips in South America.

References 

Characidae
Freshwater fish of South America
Freshwater fish of Colombia
Taxa named by Marion Durbin Ellis
Fish described in 1909